These Eyes Before is a cover album by Collide, released on October 31, 2009 by Noiseplus Music.

Reception
Addicted to Media claimed These Eyes Before "gives the feeling of hearing these songs for the first time and falling in love with them all over again" and that the band's "respect for the artists and the songs they covered is evident and the production of the songs is flawless." Release Magazine gave the album six out of ten and said "Collide have developed their own sexy, slow, groovy sound over the years, and manage to keep that throughout, keeping it interesting" but that "they always slow the songs down, which means that some songs lose their energy in the process."

Track listing

Personnel
Adapted from the These Eyes Before liner notes.

Collide
 Eric Anest (as Statik) – keyboards, sequencer, noises, production, mixing, cover art, illustrations, photography, design, electric guitar (2, 6, 9)
 Karin Johnston (as Tripp9) – vocals, cover art, illustrations, photography, design

Additional performers
 Seth Adams – instruments (9)
 David Assaleth – instruments (9)
 Chantel Anderson – instruments (9)
 Garrett Bean – instruments (9)
 Jordan Brannan – instruments (9)
 Mitchell Brown – instruments (9)
 Verdes Cato – instruments (9)
 Susan Clothier – director
 Darrien Cohens – instruments (9)
 Ryan Elliott – instruments (9)
 Brad Gessner – instruments (9)
 Coulter Harris – instruments (9)
 Christine Henderson – instruments (9)
 Joel Illgen – director
 Connor Kennedy – instruments (9)
 Jon Koenn – instruments (9)
 Amy Kongs – instruments (9)
 Kai Kurosawa – bass guitar (1, 3, 10)
 Scott Landes – electric guitar (1, 2, 7, 8, 10), acoustic guitar (1)
 Mike Lausser – instruments (9)
 Tyler Long – arrangements
 Kevin Mat – instruments (9)
 Austin Meyer – instruments (9)
 Kevin Miller – instruments (9)
 Jeff Newell – instruments (9)
 Putnam City North High School Marching Band – arrangements
 Santiago Ramones – instruments (9)
 Cameron Satterlee – instruments (9)
 Jordan Satterlee – instruments (9)
 Brittany Savage – instruments (9)
 Brianna Schlosser – instruments (9)
 Rogerio Silva – electric guitar (3, 4, 7), acoustic guitar (1)
 Jon Stroud – instruments (9)
 David Waters – instruments (9)
 Kim Wheeler – instruments (9)
 Ellen Whiteley – instruments (9)
 Farris M.C. Willinghammer – instruments (9)

Production and design
 Brooks Anderson – recording
 Chris Bellman – mastering
 Dave Keffer – photography

Release history

References

External links 
 These Eyes Before at collide.net
 
 These Eyes Before at Bandcamp
 These Eyes Before at iTunes

Collide (band) albums
2009 albums
Covers albums